Cryptochile, the Namaqua darkling beetles, is a genus of darkling beetles in the subfamily Pimeliinae.

References

External links 

 
 Cryptochile at Biolib
 Cryptochile at insectoid.info

Pimeliinae
Tenebrionidae genera